Nancy Elinor Adler is an American health psychologist. She is the Lisa and John Pritzker Professor of Medical Psychology at the University of California, San Francisco (UCSF) and director of UCSF's Center for Health and Community Sciences. Adler is known for her research on health behaviors, health disparities, and social determinants of health.

Adler has been the director of the MacArthur Foundation's Research Network on Socioeconomic Status and Health since it was founded in December 1996. She is the director of the Evidence for Action (E4A), a UCSF program funded by the Robert Wood Johnson Foundation to build a culture of health.

Honors and awards
Adler is a fellow of the American Psychological Society (APS) and the American Psychological Association (APA), as well as a member of the American Academy of Arts and Sciences and the National Academy of Medicine (NAM).

Adler received the APA Distinguished Scientific Award for the Applications of Psychology in 2009. The award cited her "research on reproductive health examining adolescent decision making with regard to contraception, conscious and preconscious motivations for pregnancy, and perception of risk for sexually transmitted diseases, and for her groundbreaking insights into the importance of psychological processes in explaining why socioeconomic status is associated with physical health." Other awards include:

 J. Michael McGinnis Leadership Excellence Award from the  Interdisciplinary Association for Population Health Science (2020)
 New York Academy of Medicine's Academy Medal for Distinguished Contributions in Biomedical Science (2017) 
 APS James McKeen Cattell Fellow Award (2013)
 APA Newman-Proshansky Prize for Lifetime Achievement in Population Psychology (2011)
 NAM David Rall Medal (2010)

Biography 
Adler completed her undergraduate studies at Wellesley College, where she conducted research with Claire Zimmerman. She entered the PhD Program in Social Relations at Harvard University in 1968 and was mentored by Herbert Kelman, an expert on social influence and cognitive dissonance.  For her 1974 PhD thesis titled "Reactions of Women to Therapeutic Abortion: A Social Psychological Analysis" Adler interviewed women before and after having an abortion. She found that women's reactions were generally positive and reflective of healthy coping strategies.

Adler taught at the University of California, Santa Cruz prior to joining the faculty of UCSF.  In 1980, she served a term as the President of Society for Environmental, Population, and Conservation Psychology (APA Division 34). Adler has chaired multiple NAM committees and workshops on subjects including the Deepwater Horizon oil spill, sexually transmitted diseases, psychosocial treatments for cancer patients, and women's health.

Adler is married to Arnold Milstein. They have collaborated on research and have two daughters together.

Selected works

 Adler, N. E., Boyce, T., Chesney, M. A., Cohen, S., Folkman, S., Kahn, R. L., & Syme, S. L. (1994). Socioeconomic status and health: the challenge of the gradient. American Psychologist, 49(1), 15-24.
 Adler, N. E., Epel, E. S., Castellazzo, G., & Ickovics, J. R. (2000). Relationship of subjective and objective social status with psychological and physiological functioning: Preliminary data in healthy, White women. Health Psychology, 19(6), 586-592.
 Adler, N. E., & Newman, K. (2002). Socioeconomic disparities in health: pathways and policies. Health Affairs, 21(2), 60-76.
 Adler, N. E., & Ostrove, J. M. (1999). Socioeconomic status and health: what we know and what we don't. Annals of the New York Academy of Sciences, 896(1), 3-15.
 Adler, N. E., & Snibbe, A. C. (2003). The role of psychosocial processes in explaining the gradient between socioeconomic status and health. Current Directions in Psychological Science, 12(4), 119-123.

References

External links
Faculty page

Living people
American women psychologists
University of California, San Francisco faculty
Wellesley College alumni
Harvard Graduate School of Arts and Sciences alumni
Fellows of the Association for Psychological Science
Fellows of the American Psychological Association
Fellows of the American Academy of Arts and Sciences
Members of the National Academy of Medicine
Year of birth missing (living people)
21st-century American women